Uromyces oblongus is a plant pathogen infecting alfalfa.

References

External links
 Index Fungorum
 USDA ARS Fungal Database

Fungal plant pathogens and diseases
oblongus
Fungi described in 1877